The musicians may have been signed under one of EMI's subsidiary labels. The subsidiary is noted next to the artist if this is the case.

Popular

Pre-1960
Nat King Cole (Capitol)
Tennessee Ernie Ford (Capitol)
Judy Garland (Capitol)
Nicolai Gedda (HMV)
The Goons (Parlophone)
Wanda Jackson (Capitol)
Dick James (Parlophone)
The Kingston Trio (Capitol)
Umm Kulthum (EMI Arabia)
Dean Martin (Capitol)
Liza Minnelli (Capitol/Angel)
Cliff Richard (Columbia Graphophone)
Jimmy Shand (Parlophone)
Dinah Shore (Capitol)
Frank Sinatra
Gene Vincent (Capitol)
Muna Salah   (Capitol)

1960s

The Band (Capitol)
The Beach Boys (Capitol)
The Beatles (Parlophone/EMI/Capitol/Apple). Now bought by Universal.
Bobby Darin (Capitol)
Gerry and the Pacemakers (Columbia Gramophone)
The Animals (Columbia Graphophone, left in 1966)
The Yardbirds (Columbia Gramophone)
The Hollies (Parlophone/EMI, 1963–1972, 1986–Present)
Gullivers People (Parlophone/EMI, 1965–1969)
Pink Floyd (Tower/Harvest/EMI/Capitol/Columbia Gramophone)
The Pretty Things (Harvest/Columbia Gramophone, 1968–1972)
Deep Purple (Parlophone/Purple/Harvest, left in 1976; EMI for Japan and Europe outside UK, 1997–2003)
Cilla Black (Parlophone)
Pepe Jaramillo (Parlophone, EMI)
Billy J. Kramer (Parlophone)
The Fourmost (Parlophone)
The Shadows (Columbia Gramophone/EMI, left in 1980)
Herman's Hermits (Columbia Gramophone)
The Dave Clark Five (Columbia Gramophone)
Ahmad Zahir (Capitol, EMI)
Helen Shapiro (Columbia Gramophone)
Manfred Mann (HMV, left in 1966)
The Move (Regal Zonophone)
Procol Harum (Regal Zonophone, left in 1970)
T. Rex (band) (Regal Zonophone)
Joe Cocker (Regal Zonophone/EMI, 1968–1970, 1999–2007)
Peter and Gordon (Columbia Gramophone/Capitol)
The Swallows (Malaysian Band) (Columbia)

1970s–present
22-20s (Heavenly)
Thirty Seconds to Mars
Air Traffic (Tiny Consumer)
Ai (EMI Records/EMI Records Japan/EMI Music Japan)
Airbourne
Aleesia (EMI/A-Lista)
Alfie (Regal)
All-4-One
Ahmad Zahir
Ilham al-Madfai
Lily Allen (Regal/Parlophone/Capitol)
Alpha Galates
A-mei (EMI Music Taiwan)
Namie Amuro (EMI Music Japan, left in 1995)
Anahí
Andra & The Backbone (EMI/Arka Music Indonesia)
Leif Ove Andsnes
Angelic Upstarts (EMI Zonophone)
Keren Ann
Jack Jersey (EMI Netherlands) (Capitol Records)
Anouk (EMI Netherlands)
Adam Ant
AFI
Alison Wonderland
Apawk (Capitol)
Arrows (RAK Records)
Art Brut (Mute)
Richard Ashcroft (Hut/Virgin/EMI/Parlophone)
Athlete (Regal)
Auf der Maur
Australian Crawl
Avant
Avion (EMI Australia)
Charles Aznavour
Melanie B (Virgin, dropped in 2001)
Lloyd Banks (G-Unit/EMI)
Barenaked Ladies
Bassheads (Parlophone/Deconstruction, dropped in 2003)
The Barracudas
The Be Be See (EMI Records)
Beastie Boys (Parlophone/Capitol)
Beau Dommage (Capitol)
Bebe
Victoria Beckham (Virgin, dropped in 2002)
Belinda  (Capitol)
Belouis Some (Parlophone/Capitol)
The Beta Band (Regal)
BlaaZe (Virgin)
Black Dice (DFA Records)
Black Rebel Motorcycle Club (Virgin, left in 2004)
Black Sabbath (I.R.S./EMI, 1989–1996)
Bleikr Morrison (I.R.S./EMI, 1995-1996)
Blue (Innocent/Virgin)
Blue Mink (Regal Zonophone)
Blur (Food/Parlophone)
David Bowie (Parlophone/Virgin)
Jeff Bridges (EMI/Blue Note)
Lisa Brokop (Capitol, left in 1996)
Garth Brooks (Capitol/Liberty/Parlophone)
Meredith Brooks (Capitol, left in 1999)
Brotherhood of Man (1982–83)
James Brown
Emma Bunton (Virgin, dropped in 2002)
Darren Burn
Burning Spear
Kate Bush
Melanie C (Virgin, dropped in 2003)
John Cale
Camper Van Beethoven (Virgin America)
Captain (EMI Records)
Cass Phang (EMI Music Hong Kong)
Crookers
Mariah Carey (Virgin, 2001–2002)
Pat Carl
Belinda Carlisle (Virgin, 1993 & 1996)
Kim Carnes
Carpark North
Hayko Cepkin (EMI Turkey/Kent)
Ruben Chacon (Capitol)
The Chemical Brothers (Virgin)
Chiddy Bang (Parlophone)
Chingy (Parlophone/Capitol, left in 2007)
Chumbawamba (EMI)
Anne Clark (EMI UK) 1982-1994
Claytown Troupe (EMI USA/UK) 1991–1992
Joe Cocker (Parlophone)
Cockney Rejects (EMI & EMI Zonophone)
Coldplay (Parlophone/Capitol)
Conor Maynard (Parlophone)
The Colour  (Rethink)
The Concretes (Astralwerks)
Elvis Costello
Graham Coxon (Parlophone)
DJ Crazy Toones (Lench Mob Records)
Crowded House (Capitol)
Myriam Montemayor Cruz
Daft Punk (Virgin)
The Dandy Warhols (Parlophone/Capitol)
The Decemberists (Capitol)
Delirious? (Sparrow)
The Departure (Parlophone)
Depeche Mode (Mute, Capitol/Virgin US until 2012)
Design (Regal Zonophone/EMI)
Device (Chrysalis)
Dewa 19 (EMI Music Hong Kong/Indonesia/Arka Music)
Dewi Dewi (EMI/Arka Music Indonesia)
Ahmad Dhani(EMI/Arka Music Indonesia)
Dirty Vegas (Parlophone)
The Divine Comedy (Parlophone)
Doughboy (Lench Mob Records)
Doves (Heavenly)
Dubstar (Food)
The Duke Spirit (Heavenly)
Duran Duran (Harvest/Capitol/EMI)
Sheena Easton
The Elkcloner
Electric Light Orchestra (Harvest, left in 1973)
Eloy (Harvest/Electrola/EMI, left in 1984)
Elva Hsiao (Virgin Music Taiwan/EMI Music Taiwan)
Shawn Emanuel (EMI Music, left in 2007)
Empire (Parlophone)
Enigma (Virgin)
Erasure (Mute)
Eric Johnson (Vortexan)
Eternal (left in 2000)
Euphoria (EMI Australia)
Exaltasamba
Faith Evans(Capitol)
Evanescence(Wind-Up Records)
Everclear (Capitol, left in 2004)
Exodus (Capitol)
Ezequielized Odyssey
Faker (Capitol)
Falco
Fairuz (EMI Arabia)
Fatboy Slim (Astralwerks)
Kevin Federline (Federation Records)
Tiziano Ferro (EMI Music Italy)
Fey (EMI Music/Capitol)
Neil Finn (Parlophone)
Fire 12
Fischerspooner
Five Finger Death Punch
The Flowers (EMI Music China)
Jo FloWroshus (Capitol/EMI/History Makerz)
Foo Fighters (Roswell/Parlophone/Capitol, left in 1999)
Michael Franti and Spearhead (Parlophone)
The J. Geils Band
The Generators (Orlando, Florida version)
Debbie Gibson (SBK, 1995, left after one album)
David Gilmour (EMI/Columbia)
Gary Glitter
Goldfrapp (Mute)
Diego González
Gorillaz (Parlophone)
Edyta Górniak (from 1996, moved to Virgin in 2002, dropped in 2004)
 Gouge (EMI, Robyn Godfrey-Cass signing in 1996, 5 album deal, after leaving indie label Fluffy Bunny)
Grand Avenue
Grand Funk Railroad (Capitol)
Amy Grant (Sparrow/EMI/Capitol Christian Group, signed in 2007 after leaving Warner/Word)
Great White (Capitol)
David Guetta (Astralwerks)
G-Unit (G-Unit/EMI)
Adrian Gurvitz (RAK)
Geri Halliwell (Capitol/Virgin/Innocent, contract finished in 2005)
Hallway Productions (Lench Mob Records)
Ed Harcourt (Heavenly)
Steve Harley & Cockney Rebel (now part of Parlophone)
George Harrison (Parlophone/Apple)
Corey Hart (Capitol/EMI America/Manhattan) (outside Canada)
Nazia Hassan
Zohaib Hassan
Mike Hawkins (Virgin / EMI DK)
Richard Hawley (Mute)
Oliver Haze
Heart (Capitol)
Heroes del Silencio
Honey Bane (Zonophone)
Jake Hook (EMI Music Publishing)
Jeffrey Hooper
Hot Chip
Hot Chocolate (RAK)
Houston (singer) (Capitol)
Stanley Huang (Virgin Music China/Capitol Music Taiwan)
Hurt
Ice Cube (Lench Mob Records)
Idlewild (Parlophone, left in 2005)
Interpol (Capitol/Parlophone, UK)
Iron Maiden (EMI, Harvest/Capitol US 1980–1990, 1993–1995, currently on Universal Music Group in North America)
Alan Jackson (EMI Nashville)
Janet Jackson (Virgin, completed contract and left in 2006)
Jaguares (EMI)
Jay Chou (Virgin, 2006–2012)
Jessica Simpson (Primary Wave)
Mulan Jameela (EMI Music Indonesia)
Duncan James (Innocent/Virgin)
Jane's Addiction (Parlophone/Capitol)
Matthew Jay
Pepe Jaramillo (EMI)
Jean Michel Jarre (from August 2007 until 2012)
Dr. John (Parlophone)
Norah Jones (Parlophone/Blue Note/Capitol)
Junior Senior
Junoon
Kajagoogoo (Parlophone)
Laura Michelle Kelly (Angel)
Kenna
Nusrat Fateh Ali Khan (Real World)
Killa Mike  (EMI)
King Biscuit Time (Regal)
Kings of Convenience
The Knack (Capitol)
Beverley Knight (Parlophone)
Jordan Knight
Korn (Virgin, left and are now independent)
Kraftwerk (EMI/Capitol since 1975, Astralwerks US as of 2001; Mute Europe as of 2009)
Leo Ku (Gold Label)
Kudai (Capitol)
Kyla (EMI Philippines)
Lady Antebellum (Capitol Nashville)
Cristy Lane
Marit Larsen (Virgin, former M2M)
David Lasley
LCD Soundsystem
Legião Urbana
John Lennon (Parlophone/Apple)
LeToya (Noontime/Capitol)
Huey Lewis and the News (Chrysalis Records)
Libera
Little River Band (EMI Australia/Harvest, then Capitol; until 1986)
Alex Lloyd (left in 2004)
Justin Lo (Gold Label)
Loane (Virgin/EMI Music France)
Lolene (Capitol/EMI)
Lollipop (EMI Capitol Taiwan)
Los Mismos (left in 2001)
Ruth Lorenzo (EMI/Virgin, May 2009)
Louise (left in December 2001)
Love is All (Parlophone, one album)
M2M (under negotiation for a reunion album)
Madredeus
Mae (Capitol)
The Magic Numbers (Heavenly)
Maids of Gravity (Virgin/Vernon Yard)
Die Mannequin
Manowar (left after two weeks)
Marillion
Marinella
Lene Marlin (Virgin)
Junior Martinez (EMI UK)
Richard Marx (EMI USA/Manhattan/Capitol)
Willy Mason (Astralwerks)
Abraham Mateo (EMI Spain)
Keiko Matsui (Narada)
Paul McCartney (Parlophone/Capitol/Apple). Left in 2007. Owns solo back catalogue rights, which were licensed to Concord Music Group in 2010 and transferred to Capitol in 2016.
McFly (Super)
Megadeth (Capitol)
Meat Loaf (Virgin Records) One album: Bat Out of Hell III: The Monster Is Loose
Memorain (EMI Greece, contract finished in 2010)
George Michael (Virgin) 1996–1999. Owned solo back catalogue rights from that time, which were licensed to Sony Music Entertainment in 2008.
Michael Learns to Rock (EMI Denmark/Medley)
Mina
Kylie Minogue (Parlophone)
Rickey Montena
Mandy Moore (The Firm Music)
Morrissey (His Master's Voice/Parlophone)
Bob Mould (Virgin)
Mud (RAK)
Róisín Murphy
The Music (Hut)
Na Ying
Naast
Nachlader
Kary Ng (Gold Label)
Nickelback (Canada only)
Martin Nievera (EMI Philippines)
Nine Times Bodyweight
O'G3NE (EMI Netherlands)
Oh Land
Omarion (EMI/StarWorld Entertainment/T.U.G.)
One More Girl
Operator Please (Virgin)
Orbital (EMI –one album Octane (OST), released separately from their catalogue with FFRR/London Records)
Stacie Orrico  (Virgin)
Beth Orton (1996–2005 Heavenly, 2005–present)
Otep (Capitol)
Fito Páez (left; now with Warner/Sony Music)
Papa VS Pretty (Peace + Riot)
Sabri brothers
Sarina Paris (EMI Italy)
Jennylyn Mercado (EMI Philippines)
Katy Perry  (Parlophone/Capitol)
Pet Shop Boys (Parlophone/EMI) (left March 2013; now with x2/Kobalt Label Services) (return 2017-present catalogue: 1985-2012)
Liz Phair (Capitol)
Poison (Capitol/Enigma)
Power Francers (EMI Italy)
Prefab Sprout (EMI Liberty, 2001–present)
Maxi Priest (Relentless)
Prime Circle (EMI South Africa)
Los Prisioneros
Professor Green (Virgin)
Osvaldo Pugliese (EMI-Odeon)
Suzi Quatro (RAK)
Queen (Parlophone/EMI/Capitol/Hollywood Records) (left in 2011)
Queensrÿche (EMI) (left in 1997)
R.E.M. (I.R.S./EMI, left in 1988)
Radar
Radiohead (Parlophone/Capitol, contract finished as of 2003)
Rascals (Virgin/EMI)
Ricki-Lee
Corinne Bailey Rae
Raekwon
Raining Pleasure (Capitol/Blue Note)
Marion Raven (former M2M, Capitol as of 2008)
RBD
Red Hot Chili Peppers (left; now with Warner)
Helen Reddy
Relient K (Capitol/Gotee)
Gracie Rivera
Kenny Rogers (Liberty)
Roll Deep (Relentless)
The Rolling Stones (Virgin, left in 2008)
Sigur Rós
Diana Ross (Capitol/EMI, outside USA/Canada, 1981–present)
Vasco Rossi (EMI Italy)
Sakis Rouvas (Minos EMI Greece)
Roxette (EMI Sweden/Capitol)
Rappin P (EMI/Capitol)
Röyksopp
Rodney Rude (EMI Australia)
Rucka Rucka Ali (Pinegrove/Capitol)
Ruslana
Deric Ruttan (EMI Canada)
Lee Ryan (Virgin)
Samestate (EMI/Sparrow)
Sandy Lam (Virgin Music Hong Kong)
Satyricon
Mose Scarlett (EMI Canada)
Scotty Boy and the James Kennedys (EMI Washington)
S.H.E (EMI Music China)
Sara Tunes
Sarah Chen
Salmonella Dub (EMI New Zealand 1994–)
Scorpions (Harvest/Electrola, Europe)
Dan Seals (Capitol/Liberty)
Jay Sean (Relentless)
Bob Seger (Capitol)
Selena (EMI Latin)
The Sex Pistols (Virgin/EMI, September to December 1976)
Silent Running
Shazza
Shaye (EMI Canada)
Shenandoah (Liberty/Capitol/Free Falls/Cumberland Road)
SHINee (EMI Music Japan)
Show Lo (EMI Taiwan)
Show-Ya (Eastworld/EMI Music Japan, left in 1990)
The Sleepy Jackson (Capitol)
The Smashing Pumpkins (Caroline/Virgin/Hut, contract finished in 2001, signed with Reprise Records in 2007, went independent in 2008, re-signed to EMI in 2011)
The Smiths
Snoop Dogg
The Sonic Hearts
Soprano (EMI France)
Sparklehorse (Parlophone)
Spice Girls (Virgin)
Ringo Starr (Parlophone/Apple, left in 1976)
Starsailor
Stereo (EMI Music Netherlands)
Steriogram
Angus & Julia Stone (EMI Australia/Flock UK)
Joss Stone (Relentless)
The Stranglers
Nicholas Strunk (NICKhilton Entertainment)
Stefanie Sun (Capitol Music Taiwan)
The Sunstreak
Super Monkey's (EMI Music Japan)
Supergrass (Parlophone)
Aleks Syntek
T-ara (EMI Music Japan)
T.O.Y.
T. Rex (Regal Zonophone/Fly/EMI)
Talk Talk (Parlophone/EMI)
Talking Heads (EMI, outside USA/Canada, 1984–1991)
Tamta
Stephy Tang (Gold Label)
David Tao (EMI Music Taiwan)
Tasmin Archer
A Taste of Honey (Capitol)
The Tea Party
Telepopmusik
Tinie Tempah (Parlophone)
Tension (band) (EMI Music Taiwan)
Nicholas Teo (Virgin Music Chinese, Taiwan Branch)
Tha Trap (Lench Mob Records)
Thalía (Virgin left in 2008 now with Sony Music)
This World Fair (Rethink)
Lynda Thomas (Capitol)
Richard Thompson (Capitol)
Toxic Kompulsion
Trina (Slip-N-Slide/DP Entertainment)
Troy Ave. (EMI/Capitol)
Troye Sivan (EMI/Capitol)
Jolin Tsai (EMI/Capitol Taiwan, left in 2008)
KT Tunstall (Relentless/Virgin)
Grzegorz Turnau (Zaiks/BIEM) (Poland)
Tina Turner (Parlophone/Capitol)
Twista (Get Money Gang Entertainment/EMI/Capitol)
Keith Urban (Capitol Nashville)
Hikaru Utada
Lim Hyung Joo (2006–2007)
Valen Hsu
Van Hunt
Vanilla Ice (SBK, 1990–1994)
The Verve (Hut/Virgin/EMI/Parlophone)
Zhao Wei (EMI Music China)
Vincent Vincent and the Villains
The Vines
Vinnie Vincent Invasion (Chrysalis/Capitol)
Vixen (EMI USA/Manhattan)
Vodka Collins
W.A.S.P. (Capitol)
Waltari
Watershed (South African band) (EMI South Africa)
WC (Lench Mob Records)
Simon Webbe (Innocent/Virgin)
Matt White
The White Stripes
Whitesnake (EMI Records, outside USA/Canada)
Robbie Williams (Chrysalis/EMI)
Wilson Phillips (SBK, 1990–1993)
Wizzard (Harvest)
Fann Wong (EMI Taiwan, 1997–2000)
Faye Wong
Roy Wood (Harvest)
Wrecktangle(EMI Canada)
X Japan (USA only, until 2012)
XX Teens (Mute)
Rainie Yang (EMI Taiwan)
Tony Yayo (G-Unit/EMI)
You Me At Six (Virgin)
Young Maylay (Lench Mob Records)
Bertine Zetlitz
Peggy Zina (Minos EMI Greece)
Zona Boy And Co. (EMI UK)
Goldfish (EMI Music Netherlands)
The Moonlighters (Capitol)
Hashtag (Capitol)
F.L.Y. (Capitol)
RENEE (EMI Latin/UMG)

Classical
Classical musicians exclusively or chiefly associated with EMI (on EMI Classics, Angel, HMV and/or Columbia labels)

Roberto Alagna
Leif Ove Andsnes
Victoria de los Ángeles
Agustin Anievas
Helena Blagne
Linda Brava
Olaf Bär
Sir John Barbirolli
Sir Thomas Beecham
Ian Bostridge
Sir Adrian Boult
Dennis Brain
Maria Callas
Nazzareno Carusi
Enrico Caruso
Natalie Dessay
Jacqueline du Pré
Sir Edward Elgar
Fairuz
Mariss Jansons
Herbert von Karajan (notably in the 1950s)
Rudolf Kempe
Nigel Kennedy
Otto Klemperer
Umm Kulthum
Trey Chui-yee Lee
Dinu Lipatti
Elizabeth Marvelly
Yehudi Menuhin
Sabine Meyer
Riccardo Muti
Simon O'Neill
Antonio Pappano
Itzhak Perlman
Blair Ellis Robertson
Sir Simon Rattle
Wolfgang Sawallisch
Artur Schnabel
Elisabeth Schwarzkopf
Maxim Vengerov
Sir William Walton
Franz Welser-Möst

See also
EMI
List of EMI labels

References

EMI